Khentkaus (also Khentkawes and Khentakawess; Egyptian Ḫnt kȝw=s) was an ancient Egyptian given name. It may refer to several women lived during the Old Kingdom:
 Khentkaus I, queen of pharaoh Shepseskaf (4th Dynasty) or Userkaf (5th Dynasty)
 Khentkaus II, queen of pharaoh Neferirkare Kakai (5th Dynasty) and mother of pharaohs Neferefre and Nyuserre Ini
 Khentkaus III, possibly queen of pharaoh Neferefre (5th Dynasty)
 Princess Khentkaus, princess during the 4th Dynasty

Ancient Egyptian given names